The Order of Vasco Núñez de Balboa is an order of Panama, instituted on 1 July 1941 (Ley No. 94 de 1 de julio de 1941). It is awarded for distinguished diplomatic services and contributions to international relations between Panama and other states.

Ranks 
There are 5 ranks in the order:
 Extraordinary Grand Cross (Gran Cruz Extraordinaria)
 Grand Cross (Gran Cruz)
 Grand Officer (Gran Oficial)
 Commander (Comendador)
 Knight (Caballero)

Insignia 
The ribbon is purple with a yellow central stripe.

Notable recipients 
 Extraordinary Grand Crosses
 Juan Carlos I of Spain
 Óscar Osorio
 Grand Crosses
 Albert II, Prince of Monaco
 Miguel Alemán Velasco
 Henry H. Arnold
 Cristian Barros
 Prince Carlo, Duke of Castro
 Andrés Carrascosa Coso (2017)
 Jimmy Carter
 Jacques Diouf
 Dwight D. Eisenhower
 Felipe VI of Spain
 Guillermo Fernández de Soto
 William Halsey Jr.
 Kenneth I. Juster
 Queen Letizia of Spain
 Marc Ouellet
 Harry Radhakishun
 Queen Sofía of Spain
 Grand Officers
 Guy Harvey
 George Joulwan
 Ray E. Porter
 John F. Shafroth Jr.
 Harold C. Train
 Ester Neira de Calvo
 Li Ka-shing
 Commanders
 José Arce
 Tomasa Ester Casís
 Hector P. Garcia
 Allan L. Goldstein
 Edward Hanson
 Ernest King
 Flor María Araúz
 María Olimpia de Obaldía
 Thomas W. Stukel
 Col. William André Wedemeyer
 Knights
 Alicia Alonso
 Bernardo Benes
 Ruth Fernández
 Samuel Lewis Galindo
 Sigfrido A. Muller Espino
 Carlos Morales Troncoso
 Ernest TC-Singh

References

External links 
 Medals of the World, Panama: Order of Vasco Nuñez de Balboa
 Panama Foreign Office, State Protocol & Ceremonial Bureau (Spanish)
 Panama Condecorations (Spanish)

Vasco Nunez de Balboa, Order of
Vasco Nunez de Balboa, Order of
Awards established in 1941
1941 establishments in Panama